Adenanthera is a genus of flowering plants in the family Fabaceae. 
It contains the following species:
 Adenanthera bicolor Merr. (Sri Lanka)
 Adenanthera intermedia Merr. (Philippines)
 Adenanthera pavonina L. - Coralwood (India)

References

 
Taxonomy articles created by Polbot
Fabaceae genera